"God, Country and My Baby" is a song written by John Dolan and Chico Holiday. It was originally released by Holiday on the New Phoenix label in September 1961.

Johnny Burnette recording
Johnny Burnette recorded the song soon after the original, in October 1961. Burnette's version reached #18 on the Billboard Hot 100 in 1961. The song appeared on his 1962 album, Johnny Burnette's Hits and Other Favorites.
The song was produced by Snuff Garrett.  The Johnny Mann Singers are featured on the song.

References

1961 songs
1961 singles
Johnny Burnette songs
Song recordings produced by Snuff Garrett
Liberty Records singles
American patriotic songs
Pop ballads
Songs about the military